Frank and Tony, stylized as Frank & Tony,  are an electronic music duo, formed between two Brooklyn DJ's and dance music producers, Francis Harris and Anthony Collins, from 2012 to 2017 and again from 2020. They had produced several EPs and singles independently before working together on the eponymous deep house project.

History
In 2012, the New York-based pair formed a deep house project, releasing singles on their Scissor and Thread label, founded by Harris and honing their sound at their residency at Brooklyn’s The Panther Room and Output in Williamsburg, gaining the support of DJ Sprinkles and other members of the Brooklyn DJ scene, in the process. in 2014, they released their debut album, You Go Girl, which stayed true to the duo’s deep house foundations while also exploring dub music.

Harris and Collins both have long histories of churning out well received dance singles for DJs, with Harris' solo work focusing on more experimental outre composition and lush textures.

You Go Girl
In 2014, the group released their debut album, You Go Girl, which was widely acclaimed in publications such as The Guardian, New York Times, Resident Advisor, Fact magazine and Pitchfork media, with many of the albums singles being featured at festivals throughout 2014 and 2015. "Villa Seurat" became the most prominent song on the album, featured prominently in other DJ's mixes and playlists.

Though the album's sound is influenced by nineties deep house classics, it broke new ground by exploring dub and bass music, earning the group comparisons to Basic Channel and Black Coffee, and was followed by various mixes for Fact Magazine, Resident Advisor, Fabric London and BBC Radio One. In addition, the duo played several clubs and electronic festivals across Europe and the United States.

Breakup and Reformation
Frank & Tony officially disbanded as a duo in late 2017, with Collins moving to Marseille and opening up a restaurant, while releasing music under the moniker Gant. Harris on the other hand, has continued the Scissor and Thread imprint, including releases under his own name, while running a listening bar in Gowanus, Brooklyn. Despite this, many of the duos releases are a staple of house and techno sets to this day, a testament to the groups enduring influence.

In 2019, Collins joined Harris for a few dates on his US tour. It was later revealed in 2020 that the duo were planning on another collaboration with an EP set to be released in the summer of 2021, according to a label news release.

See also
Bob Moses (band)
Fabric
Deep house

Discography

Albums and Singles
 Frank and Tony - Presents... Vol. 1  	
 Frank and Tony - You Go Girl album - Scissor and Thread 2014		
 Frank and Tony - RA.446 album art	- Resident Advisor	RA.446	2014		
 Frank and Tony - Frank & Tony presents... -	Scissor and Thread		2012		
 Frank and Tony - What You Believe album(12", W/Lbl)- Scissor and Thread	FAT006	2014		
 Frank and Tony - Go -Scissor and Thread	FATLP01-B	2014		
 Frank and Tony - You (12")-Scissor and Thread	FATLP01-A	2014		
 Frank and Tony - The Gales (12")	Mule Musiq	mule musiq 186	2015		
 Frank and Tony - Record Store Day EP (12", EP, Ltd, W/Lbl)	Scissor and Thread	FATRSD15	2015		
 Frank and Tony - Apprentice EP  (12", EP)	Scissor and Thread	SAT23	2015		
 Frank and Tony - Waiting Ground 2016		
 Frank and Tony - Under The Jaguar Sun (12")	Scissor And Thread	SAT027	2016		
 Frank and Tony - Harmonium EP(12", EP)	Scissor and Thread	sat029	2016		
 Frank and Tony - Odes, Scissor and Thread2017		

DJ Mixes
 Frank and Tony - FACT Mix 492 album art	
 FACT Mix 492 (File, MP3, Mixed, 320)	FACT Magazine	FACT 492	2015''

References

American electronic music groups
Musical groups from Brooklyn
American musical duos